Drenas, also known as Gllogoc or Glogovac, is a town and municipality in central Kosovo. As of the 2011 census, there were 6,143 people residing in Drenas and 58,531 in the municipality.

History 

The municipality of Drenas was established before World War II. While the Yugoslavs were in power economic growth was low. Since 2000, there has been a gradual improvement in economic, agricultural, educational, medical and industrial growth. Municipal development has affected the construction of network-educational system, health and service network intensifying agricultural development has become especially after the construction of the irrigation system "Iber Lepenci", while a positive movement for the economy is marked by Ferronikeli, a local mining and smelting operation.

Prior and during the Kosovo War (1998–99), the ethnic Albanian separatist Kosovo Liberation Army (KLA) had a strong level of influence and during the war controlled large areas of the municipality. Drenica, including the municipality was consequently badly affected. During the war, there were instances of massacres carried out by Federal Republic of Yugoslavia forces. Mass graves were later exhumed in an attempt to conceal crimes.

Geography 

Drenas municipality is located in central Kosovo, between the Čičavica mountains in the east and the Drenica hills in the north and west. The main road from Pristina to Peja crosses the municipality. At a junction at Komorani village, a smaller road extends north from the highway, passing through Drenas town and continuing to Skenderaj.

Climate 

Media 

There are two Radio Stations, "92.1 Capital FM" broadcasting on a regional coverage, and "Radio Dodona" of which at the moment is not operating for unknown reasons, and there is a local TV station "Star TV" broadcasting on cable only.

Sports 
KF Feronikeli
KB Feronikeli
KFF Feronikeli

Economy 

Ferronikeli mine and smelter operation provided jobs for more than 2,000 people at the peak of its production in 1988. As of 2019, it was "the largest exporter in Kosovo, accounting for about 40% of the country's exports". While the presence of significant ore deposits was noticed as long ago as 1958, the plant was commissioned in 1984 while the Socialist FRY was in power. The deposits are of the lateritic type. Heavy damages were inflicted on the facility during the 1999 conflict, leaving it inoperable. Ferronikeli was privatised after the war by Alferon Management. Since July 2018 the most recent owners are called Balfin Group, who took over the project after it had been idle for four months. The plant contributes to the infrastructure of the municipality with power, including water supply and an electric grid. Four nickel mines operate in the region: Čikatovo, Dushkaja, Gllavica and Suke.

Two quarries at Korroticë e Ulët and Çikatovë e Vjeter have become operational since the conflict.

A major development is the building of the Trade Centre, which was completed by mid-2004. The municipality played a central role in the whole process by co-ordinating the financing, construction and management of the project. The Trade Centre contains 134 shops and offices for small businesses.

Notable people 
 Izet Ibrahimi – Former Mayor of Drenas, Phd of Metallurgy
 Jakup Krasniqi – Former Chairman of the Assembly of Kosovo
 Rifat Kukaj – Notable Poet, Writer for Children
 Iljaz Prokshi – Novelist
 Rainer Wieland – Vice President of the European Parliament, honorary citizen of Drenas

Notes

References

External links 

Municipality of DrenasOfficial Website 

 
Municipalities of Kosovo
Cities in Kosovo
Drenica